Demario Richard (born December 2, 1996) is an American football running back who is currently a free agent. He played college football at Arizona State

High school career
Richard attended Palmdale High School in Palmdale, California, where he totaled 5,500 career all-purpose yards, including 4,251 rushing yards and 63 rushing touchdowns in three years. He was rated as a four-star recruit by Scout and ESPN.

College career
As a freshman at Arizona State in 2014, Richard gained 478 rushing yards, scored eight touchdowns and was named the 2014 Sun Bowl's most valuable player. He is sometimes referred to by the nickname "Baby Beast Mode".

As a sophomore in 2015, Richard gained 1,104 rushing yards and 1,407 yards from scrimmage and scored 10 touchdowns.  Entering his senior season, Richard's nine 100 yard rushing games ranks him ninth in school history.

Professional career

Atlanta Falcons
Richard signed with the Atlanta Falcons as an undrafted free agent on May 1, 2018. He was waived on June 13, 2018.

Arizona Hotshots
Richard signed with the Arizona Hotshots of the AAF for the 2019 season, but failed to make the final roster.

References

External links
 

1996 births
Living people
American football running backs
Players of American football from California
Sportspeople from Los Angeles County, California
People from Palmdale, California
Arizona State Sun Devils football players
Atlanta Falcons players
Arizona Hotshots players